The 2014–15 LIU Brooklyn Blackbirds men's basketball team represented The Brooklyn Campus of Long Island University during the 2014–15 NCAA Division I men's basketball season. The Blackbirds, led by third year head coach Jack Perri, played their home games at the Steinberg Wellness Center, with several home games at the Barclays Center, and were members of the Northeast Conference. They finished the season  12–18, 8–10 in NEC play to finish in a tie for seventh place. They lost in the quarterfinals of the NEC tournament to St. Francis Brooklyn.

Roster

Schedule

|-
!colspan=9 style="background:#000000; color:#FFFFFF;"|  Regular Season

|-
!colspan=9 style="background:#000000; color:#FFFFFF;"| NEC tournament

|-

References

LIU Brooklyn Blackbirds men's basketball seasons
Long Island
LIU Brooklyn Blackbirds men's b
LIU Brooklyn Blackbirds men's b